KAMZ (103.5 FM) is a radio station  broadcasting a Regional Mexican format. Licensed to Tahoka, Texas, United States, the station serves the Lubbock area.  The station is currently owned by Albert Benavides.

History
The station went on the air as KAWD on 1997-06-27.  on 2000-12-04, the station changed its call sign to the current KAMZ.

Translators
In addition to the main station, KAMZ is relayed by an additional FM translator to widen its broadcast area.

References

External links

AMZ